Tower House is a 1962 Indian Hindi language suspense thriller film produced by J.C. Malhotra and directed by Nisar Ahmad Ansari.

Cast 
 Ajit as Suresh Kumar 
 Shakila as Savita
 N.A.Ansari as Ranjeet
 S.N.Bannerji as Seth Durgadas
 Pratima Devi as Suresh's Mother
 Nilofer
 Rajan Kapoor
 Najma
 Lotan
 Raj Rani
 Champak
 Shukla
 Madhu Mati
 Bhagwan as Ajay

Soundtrack 
The music of the film was composed by Ravi and songs penned by Asad Bhopali and S. H. Bihari.

References

External links

1962 films
1960s Hindi-language films
Films scored by Ravi